The 1976–77 Cleveland Barons season was the first season for this franchise in Cleveland, after nine seasons in the San Francisco Bay Area as the Oakland Seals/California Golden Seals. The Barons displaced the World Hockey Association's Cleveland Crusaders, who elected to relocate to Minnesota and become the Minnesota Fighting Saints.

The Barons played in the tough Adams Division and spent most of the season in last place. Midway through the season, majority owner Melvin Swig announced the team might have trouble finishing the season. The club missed payroll twice in February, and only a loan from the league and NHLPA kept the team afloat. Following the season, minority owner George Gund III purchased a controlling interest in the club.

Offseason

Amateur Draft

The franchise participated in the 1976 Amateur Draft as the California Golden Seals, the move to Cleveland not being approved until mid-July.

Regular season

Schedule and results

Regular season

Detailed records

Player stats

Skaters
Note: GP = Games played; G = Goals; A = Assists; Pts = Points; PIM = Penalties in minutes

†Denotes player spent time with another team before joining Barons. Stats reflect time with the Barons only. ‡Traded/released mid-season

Goaltenders
Note: GP = Games played; TOI = Time on ice (minutes); W = Wins; L = Losses; T = Ties; GA = Goals against; SO = Shutouts; GAA = Goals against average

†Denotes player spent time with another team before joining Seals. Stats reflect time with the Seals only. ‡Traded mid-season

Transactions
The Barons were involved in the following transactions during the 1976–77 season:

Trades

Additions and subtractions

References
 Barons on Hockey Database
 Barons on Database Hockey

 

Cleve
Cleve
Cleveland Barons (NHL)
Cleveland
Cleveland